James Veitch may refer to:
 James Veitch, Lord Elliock (1712–1793), Scottish advocate, judge, politician and landowner
 James Veitch (comedian), British comedian, director, writer and producer 
 James Veitch (horticulturist) (1792–1863), English horticulturist
 James Veitch Jr. (1815–1869), English horticulturist
 James Herbert Veitch (1868–1907), English horticulturist
 James Veitch (minister) (1808–1879), minister of the Church of Scotland, astronomer and geologist